Robert Joseph Carpenter, Jr. (born April 20, 1955) is a former American football running back who played 10 seasons in the National Football League. He is the father of linebacker Bobby Carpenter, former University of Cincinnati linebacker Johnathan Carpenter, former Marshall University linebacker George Carpenter, and former Ohio defensive back Nathan Carpenter.  He currently resides in Lancaster, Ohio and is a gym teacher at Lancaster High School.

College career

Carpenter played for the Miami Redskins from 1973 to 1976, where he was a three-year letterman.  He played for two Mid-American Conference championship teams in 1974 and 1975.  In his final two seasons, he made first team All-MAC, and was an honorable mention on the College Football All-America Team, rushing for 1,142 yards as a Junior and 1,064 yards as a senior.  In four seasons for the Redskins, Carpenter rushed for 2,909 yards and 28 touchdowns, while also catching 35 passes for 315 yards and two more scores.  Carpenter was inducted into Miami's athletic Hall of Fame in 1988.

NFL career

Carpenter was selected by the Houston Oilers in the third round of the 1977 draft.  After a solid 652-yard rushing season as a rookie, Carpenter spent most of his next three seasons as a blocking fullback for Houston's new star running back Earl Campbell, though he still managed to rush for over 340 yards in each one. In a 1979 divisional playoff game against the San Diego Chargers, Carpenter filled in for an injured Campbell, leading the team in rushing with 67 yards while also catching four passes for 23 yards in a 17–14 upset victory, despite being barely recovered from a knee injury himself, reportedly not taking a painkiller in order to "feel the pain." In 1981, Carpenter was traded to the New York Giants after the fourth week for a third round draft pick. He went on to have the best season of his career, rushing for a career high 822 yards, including four 100-yard games, before going on to lead the Giants to their first playoff victory in decades, carrying the ball 33 times for a franchise postseason record 161 yards while also catching four passes for 32 in a 27–21 win over the Philadelphia Eagles.  Carpenter called the game "the greatest football day of my life".  Carpenter went on to rush for 61 yards and catch 3 passes for 18 in New York's loss to San Francisco in the following week.  He continued playing for the Giants until 1985.  Then after spending 1986 with the Los Angeles Rams, Carpenter retired with 6,070 career yards from scrimmage and 34 touchdowns.

In his final years on the Giants, Carpenter served as a mentor to fullback John Tuggle, who was the last pick of the 1983 NFL draft.  Carpenter helped Tuggle became the first player ever picked last in the draft to make the NFL on the team that drafted him, and Tuggle ended up relieving him as starting fullback when he suffered an injury in week 13.  Tuggle was diagnosed with cancer in the offseason and never played again, dying on August 30th, 1986.  Carpenter said the experience effected him significantly, telling the New York Times "I think about him every day.  I loved his enthusiasm right away. He was very positive and friendly, so I tried to get him that fifth running back spot on the team."  Carpenter also said Tuggle's struggle with cancer influenced his decision to leave the team in 1985, stating "I had a hard time dealing with it. Since I felt so responsible for his making the team, I felt I had to get out of there."

References

1955 births
Living people
People from Lancaster, Ohio
American football running backs
Miami RedHawks football players
Houston Oilers players
New York Giants players
Los Angeles Rams players